Worster-Drought may refer to:

 Cecil Charles Worster-Drought (1888–1971), British medical doctor, physician, neurologist
Worster-Drought syndrome, a form of congenital suprabulbar paresis associated with cerebral palsy
Familial British dementia, aka Worster-Drought syndrome

See also

 Drought (disambiguation)
 Worster, a surname